Oxyurichthys visayanus is a species of goby found in the western Pacific from Amami Ōshima to Iriomotejima and the Philippines.

References

Masuda, H., K. Amaoka, C. Araga, T. Uyeno and T. Yoshino, 1984. The fishes of the Japanese Archipelago. Vol. 1. Tokai University Press, Tokyo, Japan. 437 p. 

visayanus
Fish of the Pacific Ocean
Fish of the Philippines
Taxa named by Albert William Herre
Fish described in 1927